Tennis at the 2011 Pacific Games in Nouméa, New Caledonia was held on August 29–September 8, 2011.

Medal summary

Medal table

Medals events

See also
 Tennis at the Pacific Games

References

External links
Tennis at the 2011 Pacific Games

2011 Pacific Games
Pacific Games
2011